Vivaldo is both a surname and a given name. Notable people with the name include:

Danilo Vivaldo (born 1987), Brazilian footballer
Jorge Vivaldo (born 1967), Argentine footballer and manager
Vivaldo Eduardo (born 1966), Angolan handball coach
Vivaldo Frota (1928–2015), Argentine politician, lawyer, and academic